Mayet is a surname. Notable people with the surname include:

Carl Mayet (1810–1868), German chess player
Jean-François Mayet (born 1940), French politician
Muhammed Mayet (born 1998), South African cricketer
Valéry Mayet (1839–1909), French entomologist

See also
Maye (surname)